Pitt Street may refer to:

Pitt Street, Sydney, Australia
Pitt Street, Hong Kong
Pitt Street (Manhattan), New York City, USA
Pitt Street, George Town, Penang, Malaysia
Pitt Street, Singapore
Pitt Street, Glasgow
Pitt Street, London